Presidential elections were held in Niger on 1 October 1970. The country was a one-party state at the time, with the Nigerien Progressive Party – African Democratic Rally as the sole legal party. Its leader, incumbent president Hamani Diori, was the only candidate, and was re-elected unopposed. Voter turnout was reported to be 98.3%.

Results

References

Niger
1970 in Niger
Presidential elections in Niger
One-party elections
Single-candidate elections